Battle Ground is a city in Clark County, Washington, United States. The population was 20,743 at the 2020 census.  Between 2000 and 2005, Battle Ground ranked fourth in the state for population growth, out of 279 eligible incorporated communities. As of 2021, its population is 21,119.

History

Name
Battle Ground got its name from a standoff between a group of the Klickitat peoples and a military force from the Vancouver Barracks, which had recently transitioned to a U.S. Army post. In 1855, when this occurred, members of the Klickitat peoples had been imprisoned at the Vancouver Barracks. The hostile conditions of their detainment inspired some of the Klickitats to decamp.

This group of Klickitat peoples headed north, led by Chief Umtuch (or Umtux, according to some accounts). When the community at Fort Vancouver discovered this escape, they assembled an armed contingent led by Captain William Strong to pursue the Klickitats. After great difficulty, Captain Strong's party found the Klickitats near the present-day location of downtown Battle Ground.

Details of the standoff that ensued vary. However, accounts agree that Chief Umtuch and Captain Strong engaged in some sort of negotiations which resulted in the Klickitats' agreeing to return to the Barracks. After this decision though, at least one shot was fired that murdered Chief Umtuch, likely by one of Captain Strong's soldiers.

The Klickitat asked Captain Strong to leave them alone so they could properly bury their chief. After some deliberation, Captain Strong agreed as long as the Klickitats promised to return to the Fort, which they did a couple of days later.

As a result of this event, settlers at the fort began to refer to that site as "Strong's Battle Ground", which was later shortened to "Battle Ground".

Two currently operating schools in Battle Ground are named after Captain Strong and Chief Umtuch.

Early settlement
Battle Ground was first settled in 1886 by Augustus H. Richter, who platted the town in 1902. Battle Ground was officially incorporated on June 18, 1951. During early settlement in the area, large numbers of people populated Fort Vancouver and locations closer to the Columbia River.

Geography
It is near the geographical center of Clark County.

Climate

Demographics

2010 census
As of the census of 2010, there were 17,571 people, 5,652 households, and 4,365 families residing in the city. The racial makeup of the city was 90.5% White, 0.8% African American, 0.8% Native American, 1.9% Asian, 0.3% Pacific Islander, 2.1% from other races, and 3.5% from two or more races. Hispanic or Latino of any race were 6.5% of the population. 15.0% were of German, 10.7% Irish, 9.9% English and 6.4% Ukrainian ancestry.

There were 5,652 households, of which 50.2% had children under the age of 18 living with them, 59.7% were married couples living together, 12.9% had a female householder with no husband present, 4.6% had a male householder with no wife present, and 22.8% were non-families. 17.9% of all households were made up of individuals, and 7.1% had someone living alone who was 65 years of age or older. The average household size was 3.09 and the average family size was 3.53.

The median age in the city was 30 years. 34.5% of residents were under the age of 18; 9% were between the ages of 18 and 24; 29.4% were from 25 to 44; 19.2% were from 45 to 64, and 7.9% were 65 years of age or older. The gender makeup of the city was 49.0% male and 51.0% female.

2000 census
As of the census of 2000, there were 9,296 people, 3,071 households, and 2,346 families residing in the city. The population density was 2,552.6 people per square mile (986.0/km). There were 3,196 housing units at an average density of 877.6 per square mile (339.0/km). The racial makeup of the city was 93.81% White, 0.49% African American, 0.86% Native American, 0.72% Asian, 0.11% Pacific Islander, 1.72% from other races, and 2.28% from two or more races.  Hispanic or Latino of any race were 4.14% of the population. 15.4% were of German, 11.5% United States or American, 9.4% English, 7.2% Irish, 6.1% Finnish, and 5.8% Norwegian ancestry. 94.0% spoke English, 3.9% Spanish and 1.6% Russian as their first language.

There were 3,071 households, out of which 50.4% had children under the age of 18 living with them, 58.9% were married couples living together, 12.0% had a female householder with no husband present, and 23.6% were non-families. 18.2% of all households were made up of individuals, and 7.7% had someone living alone who was 65 years of age or older. The average household size was 2.99 and the average family size was 3.43.

In the city, the age distribution of the population shows 36.2% under the age of 18, 10.0% from 18 to 24, 32.9% from 25 to 44, 13.5% from 45 to 64, and 7.3% who were 65 years of age or older. The median age was 27 years. For every 100 females, there were 95.8 males. For every 100 females age 18 and over, there were 90.5 males.

The median income for a household in the city was $45,070, and the median income for a family was $49,876. Males had a median income of $41,133 versus $25,215 for females. The per capita income for the city was $17,139. About 7.3% of families and 9.3% of the population were below the poverty line, including 11.1% of those under age 18 and 8.4% of those age 65 or over.

Events
Every summer, Battle Ground hosts Harvest Days, comprising a number of community events such as parades and a chili cook-off.

Battle Ground participates annually in the Portland Rose Festival's Grand Floral Parade, and 2019 marked the city's 65th float in the parade. In 2006, it received the Sweepstakes Award for Most Outstanding Float in the Parade.

Civic improvements
In June 2007, the City of Battle Ground opened a 25,000 square foot skate park downtown, and in 2009, a new 13,000 square foot library.

Economy
Battle Ground is also at the epicenter of the growing Clark County wine industry with three wineries and one tasting room.

Education
Battle Ground is served by the Battle Ground School District, which includes (as of 2018):
Amboy Middle School (Grades 5-8)
Battle Ground High School (Grades 9-12)
Captain Strong Elementary School (Grades 1-4)
Chief Umtuch Middle School (Grades 5-8)
Daybreak Primary School (Grades 1-4)
Daybreak Middle School (Grades 5-8)
Glenwood Heights Primary School (Grades 1-4)
Laurin Middle School (Grades 5-8)
Maple Grove Primary School (Grades 1-4)
Pleasant Valley Middle School (Grades 5-8)
Pleasant Valley Primary School (Grades 1-4)
Prairie High School (Vancouver, Washington) (Grades 9-12)
Tukes Valley Primary School (Grades 1-4)
Tukes Valley Middle School (Grades 5-8)
Yacolt Primary School (Grades 1-4)

Alternative Schools:
CASEE (Admin and Summit View) (Summit View – Grades 9-12)
Community Education
Homelink/CAM Academy (Homelink – Grades 1-12) (CAM – Grades 3-12)

Chief Umtuch Primary School, the city's oldest primary school, was demolished in 2007.
Lewisville Middle School was closed in 2007 but is still used for its gym, parking lot, and meetings.

Transportation
Battle Ground is accessed from Interstate 5 at exits 9 and 11 and Interstate 205 at exit 32. State Route 502 and State Route 503 intersect in Battle Ground.

Bus services are provided by the local transit authority, C-Tran, to Downtown Vancouver, Delta Park/Vanport MAX Station, Clark College, Hazel Dell, Yacolt, and the Vancouver Mall.

Notable people
 Richie Frahm, professional basketball player
 Bethany Joy Galeotti, actress
 Tonya Harding, figure skater
 Rob Hotchkiss, musician
 Jonathan Jackson, actor
 Zia McCabe, musician
 Kaleb McGary, NFL offensive tackle for the Atlanta Falcons
 Arnold Riegger, sport shooter and Olympian
 Richie Sexson, professional baseball player
 Gerry Staley, professional baseball player

References

Further reading
 Strong, Harry M., The Adventures of a Pioneer Judge & His Family, COLUMBIA Magazine: Winter 2002–03; Vol. 16, No. 4. The Adventures of a Pioneer Judge & His Family
 Tucker, Louise M., Battle Ground . . . In and Around, 2006.

External links
 
 History of Battle Ground at HistoryLink
 Battle Ground Chamber of Commerce

Cities in Washington (state)
Cities in Clark County, Washington
Populated places established in 1902
Portland metropolitan area
1902 establishments in Washington (state)